James Duckworth was the defending champion but chose not to defend his title.

Federico Gaio won the title after Robin Haase retired in the final trailing 1–6, 6–4, 2–4 in the third set.

Seeds
All seeds receive a bye into the second round.

Draw

Finals

Top half

Section 1

Section 2

Bottom half

Section 3

Section 4

References

External links
Main Draw
Qualifying Draw

Singles